This is a list of megaprojects. "(i.e. projects) characterized by: large investment commitment, vast complexity (especially in organizational terms), and long-lasting impact on the economy, the environment, and society". The number of such projects is so large that the list may never be fully completed.

Terms Explanation

Roads and transport infrastructure

Energy projects

Ports

Defense

Buildings

Sports

Barrages

Delta Plan

Satellites

Special Economic Zone

References 

Megaprojects
Megaprojects